Edgar Beecher Bronson (1856–1917) was a Nebraska rancher, a West Texas cattleman, an African big-game hunter, a serious photographer and starting late in life, an author of fiction and personal memoirs.  As he matured as a writer, his works showed a "marked advance...in characterization".

Bronson was a nephew of famed abolitionist Henry Ward Beecher. Formerly a reporter for the New York Tribune, Bronson headed west in 1877 to learn the cattle business under the directive of Clarence King — first director of the United States Geological Survey and owner of large mining and cattle operations in the American West. Bronson worked for one season in Wyoming before starting his own ranch with 716 cows with calves. Bronson chose Sioux County, Nebraska for the site of his first ranch.

Bibliography
Reminiscences of a Ranchman (1908)
The Red-Blooded Heroes of the Frontier (1910)
In Closed Territory (1910) - about Africa, with over 100 photos
The Vanguard (1914)
The Love of Loot and Women (1917) - published posthumously

References

External links
 
 
Works by Edgar Beecher Bronson at Google Books

1856 births
1917 deaths
People from Sioux County, Nebraska
Ranchers from Nebraska
New-York Tribune people
American male journalists
Beecher family
American memoirists